Harry F. Perretta Jr. (born July 22, 1955) is a retired American basketball coach who served as the head coach of the women's basketball team at Villanova University from 1978 to 2020. When he was hired at the age of 22, he became the youngest coach to ever head a women's varsity program at Villanova.

Coaching career
At the time that Perretta interviewed for the position of head coach, he was one of 65 applicants. He had been out of college only two months at the time, which initially prompted Villanova to drop him from serious consideration. However, Dutch Burch, the head coach at Lycoming College, sent in a letter of recommendation to Villanova—Perretta had suffered a career-ending injury to his ankle while a freshman at Lycoming, and Burch persuaded Perretta to become a student assistant coach. Perretta also coached the junior varsity team for two years.  Burch's letter helped persuade Villanova to give Perretta a chance. At the time, the women's head coaching position was part-time, and Perretta frequently came to practices wearing the work boots he wore in his morning job laying cement.

The school made it to the Final Four of the 1982 AIAW tournament, the last year that tournament was held.

Teams he has coached have earned invitations to many postseason tournaments. The 2002–03 team advanced as far as the Elite Eight.

Perretta announced on October 30, 2019 that he would retire at the end of the 2019–20 season. At the time, he had been dealing with health issues for several years. His 42nd and final season at Villanova tied him with Yvonne Kaufmann, who coached at NCAA Division III Elizabethtown from 1971 to 2012, for the most seasons as head coach at a single school in NCAA women's basketball history (including seasons in which women's sports were governed by the AIAW).

Broadcasting career
Following his retirement, Perretta began broadcasting with FOX Sports and the BIG EAST Digital Network. He debuted on FS1 in a regular season game between Villanova and St. John's on Jan. 2, 2022 and continue to work as an analyst through the 2021-22 season. Perretta was also part of the coverage team at the 2022 BIG EAST Tournament, calling games and working as a studio analyst.

Personal life
Perretta has been married since 1996; his wife Helen played for him in the 1980s, but they did not date until 1995. At the time, he was helping take care of his ailing mother. He proposed to Helen about a month after his mother's death. In a 2020 ESPN story, Helen said, "His mother was the most important thing to him. After she passed, he could move on." They have two sons, both of whom were attending Villanova in their father's final season on the bench.

Every June, Perretta and his wife visit the Poor Clares convent in Alexandria, Virginia to deliver supplies to the cloistered nuns living there. As part of an arrangement he made with the order, they visit with arguably the greatest player he coached—Shelly Pennefather, now known as Sister Rose Marie, who lives at the convent. They are separated by a glass screen during the visits, in keeping with the order's rules. For the 25th anniversary of Pennefather's final vows in 2019, marked by Sister Rose Marie renewing her vows, Perretta was one of several close friends and family members who were able to hug her for the first time since her final vows.

Awards and honors
 1995—Philadelphia Big 5 Coach of the Year
 1996—Big East Coach of the Year
 1996—Philadelphia Big 5 Coach of the Year
 2001—Philadelphia Big 5 Coach of the Year
 2003—Philadelphia Big 5 Coach of the Year
 2004—Philadelphia Big 5 Coach of the Year
 2007—Lycoming Athletic Hall of Fame in 2007
 2011—Philadelphia Sports Writers Association Special Achievement Award
Special Achievement – Charlie Manuel (Phillies manager)

Head coaching record

References

1955 births
Living people
American women's basketball coaches
Basketball coaches from Pennsylvania
Lycoming Warriors men's basketball players
People from Upper Darby Township, Pennsylvania
Sportspeople from Delaware County, Pennsylvania
Villanova Wildcats women's basketball coaches